Anderson Conceição Xavier or simply Xavier  (born January 22, 1980), is a Brazilian former football player.

Honours
Bahia State League: 1996, 1997, 1999, 2000, 2002, 2003, 2004
Brazilian North Cup: 1997, 1999
Tournament Rio — São Paulo: 2005
Brazilian League: 2005
Toto Cup: 2007

Contract
1 August 2007 to 31 May 2008

External links
 CBF
 folha
 zerozero.pt
 zanziball.it
 netvasco

1980 births
Living people
Brazilian footballers
Esporte Clube Vitória players
Sport Club Corinthians Paulista players
Maccabi Haifa F.C. players
CR Vasco da Gama players
Esporte Clube Juventude players
Expatriate footballers in Israel
Israeli Premier League players
Association football midfielders
Sportspeople from Salvador, Bahia